Eric Cole (1906–1992) was a British army officer and cricketer.

Eric Cole may also refer to:

Eric Cole (scientist), American scientist
Eric Michael Cole (born 1976), American actor

See Also
Erik Cole (born 1978), American ice hockey player